Wiederstedt is a village and a former municipality in the Mansfeld-Südharz district, Saxony-Anhalt, Germany. Since 1 September 2010, it is part of the town Arnstein.

References

Former municipalities in Saxony-Anhalt
Arnstein, Saxony-Anhalt